Naganathan Pandi (born on 23 April 1996) is an Indian athlete and police constable from Tamil Nadu. He had been selected to represent India at the 2020 Summer Olympics at the event of Men's 4 × 400m Relay.

See also 

 India at the 2020 Summer Olympics

References

External links
 
 https://olympics.com/en/news/know-the-athletes-who-are-the-members-of-india-s-4x400m-men-s-relay-team

Athletes from Tamil Nadu
Living people
1996 births
Place of birth missing (living people)
Indian police officers
Indian male sprinters
Athletes (track and field) at the 2020 Summer Olympics
Olympic athletes of India
Athletes (track and field) at the 2022 Commonwealth Games
Commonwealth Games competitors for India